Heteroconger camelopardalis is an eel in the family Congridae (conger/garden eels). It was described by Hugh Roger Lubbock in 1980. It is a non-migratory marine, tropical eel which is known from the southwestern and southeastern Atlantic Ocean, including northeastern Brazil and Ascension Island. Its population is abundant in Brazil.

References

camelopardalis
Taxa named by Roger Lubbock
Fish described in 1980